Sir Andrew Frank Davis  (born 2 February 1944) is an English conductor. He is conductor laureate of the Toronto Symphony Orchestra, the Melbourne Symphony Orchestra, and the BBC Symphony Orchestra.

Early life and education
Born in Ashridge, to Robert J. Davis and his wife Florence Joyce (née Badminton), Davis grew up in Chesham, Buckinghamshire, and in Watford. Davis attended Watford Boys' Grammar School, where he studied classics in his sixth form years.  His adolescent musical work included playing the organ at the Palace Theatre, Watford. Davis studied at the Royal Academy of Music and King's College, Cambridge, where he was an organ scholar, graduating in 1967.  He later studied conducting in Rome with Franco Ferrara.

Career
Davis' first major post was as associate conductor of the BBC Scottish Symphony Orchestra, beginning in 1970. In 1975, he became music director of the Toronto Symphony Orchestra (TSO).  He held the post until 1988, and then took the title of Conductor Laureate with the TSO.

In 1988, Davis became music director at Glyndebourne, where he met the American soprano Gianna Rolandi (1952-2021), who became his third wife. Davis concluded his Glyndebourne tenure in 2000.  In 1989, Sir John Drummond appointed Davis as chief conductor of the BBC Symphony Orchestra (BBC SO). During his BBC SO tenure, Davis restored the tradition established by Malcolm Sargent of the chief conductor of the BBC SO conducting the Last Night of The Proms.  He was noted for his humorous Last Night speeches, including giving two speeches after the Major-General's patter song from The Pirates of Penzance, but he also more seriously addressed the deaths of Diana, Princess of Wales, Mother Teresa, and Sir Georg Solti in his 1997 Last Night speech. Davis stepped down as chief conductor of BBC SO in 2000 and now holds the title of Conductor Laureate of BBC SO.

In May 1992, Davis was appointed Commander of the Order of the British Empire (CBE) and in the 1999 New Year Honours List he was appointed a Knight Bachelor. In 2002, he conducted the Prom at the Palace concert, held in the gardens of Buckingham Palace as part of the celebrations for the Queen's Golden Jubilee.

Davis became music director and principal conductor of the Lyric Opera of Chicago in 2000. His work in Chicago has included his first conducting of Der Ring des Nibelungen cycle of Richard Wagner in 2005 and the first Chicago production of Michael Tippett's The Midsummer Marriage. His Lyric Opera of Chicago tenure ended at the close of the 2020–2021 season.

In 2005, Davis became Music Advisor to the Pittsburgh Symphony Orchestra, for a designated three-year period.  In September 2006, he announced that he would relinquish this position with Pittsburgh after the 2007–2008 season. In October 2007, Davis and the orchestra mutually agreed to terminate his contract early and for him not to conduct his scheduled Pittsburgh Symphony concerts in the 2007–2008 season, because of increased demands on his schedule. Outside of the United States, in June 2012, the Melbourne Symphony Orchestra named Davis its chief conductor, effective in January 2013, with an initial contract of 4 years. In July 2015, the MSO extended Davis' contract through 2019.  Davis concluded his MSO chief conductorship in December 2019.

Davis has performed a wide range of repertoire, with a particular focus on British composers, such as Michael Tippett, including the British premiere of his work The Mask of Time.  Davis has recorded for a number of labels, including NMC Recordings, Teldec and Deutsche Grammophon. He has also made a critically acclaimed recording of Harrison Birtwistle's opera, The Mask of Orpheus.

Davis and Lady Davis resided in Chicago.  Their son Edward Frazier Davis, born in 1989, is a composer and a graduate of Knox College.

Discography
 Gustav Mahler: Lieder eines fahrenden Gesellen, Songs from Des Knaben Wunderhorn and Rückert-Lieder, with Frederica von Stade and the London Philharmonic Orchestra, Columbia, 1979

Videography
 Glyndebourne Festival Opera: a Gala Evening (1992), with Kim Begley, Montserrat Caballé, Cynthia Haymon, Felicity Lott, Benjamin Luxon, Ruggero Raimondi, Frederica von Stade and the London Philharmonic Orchestra, Arthaus Musik, 2004

References

External links

An interview with Andrew Davis recorded in 1995 – a British Library sound recording
Two interviews with Sir Andrew Davis, 8 November 1993 & 30 October 2000

 

1944 births
People educated at Watford Grammar School for Boys
Alumni of King's College, Cambridge
Alumni of the Royal College of Music
Angel Records artists
ARIA Award winners
BBC Symphony Orchestra
English classical organists
British male organists
Organ Scholars of King's College, Cambridge
English conductors (music)
British male conductors (music)
Music directors (opera)
Glyndebourne Festival Opera
Living people
Knights Bachelor
Conductors (music) awarded knighthoods
Musicians from Hertfordshire
People of the Royal Stockholm Philharmonic Orchestra
Commanders of the Order of the British Empire
Juno Award for Classical Album of the Year – Vocal or Choral Performance winners
21st-century British conductors (music)
21st-century organists
Male classical organists